Microbiology and Molecular Biology Reviews (published as MMBR) is a peer-reviewed scientific journal published by the American Society for Microbiology.

History 
The journal was established in 1937 as Bacteriological Reviews and changed its name in 1978 to Microbiological Reviews. It obtained its current title in 1997.

References

External links 
 

Delayed open access journals
Microbiology journals
Publications established in 1937
English-language journals
Quarterly journals
American Society for Microbiology academic journals